Astori is an Italian surname. Notable people with the surname include:

Constantin Astori (1889–1975), Russian artist
Danilo Astori (born 1940), Uruguayan politician
Davide Astori (1987–2018), Italian footballer
Gianfranco Astori (born 1948), Italian journalist and politician
Vicky Astori (1912–1968), Italian actress 

Italian-language surnames